Jordan da Costa, (November 24, 1932 – February 17, 2012), best known as simply Jordan, was a Brazilian football player.

Considered by Garrincha as his best defender he ever played against, Jordan was never sent off during his almost 14-year career. A skillful fullback, he was discovered by São Cristóvão in 1949 and three years later signed with Flamengo where he became an idol, winning the Rio State Championship three times in a row (1953-54-55), as well as the 1961 Rio-São Paulo Tournament.

With 609 matches for Flamengo, Jordan has the fourth-highest number of appearances for the club.

Jordan died on February 17, 2012, in Rio de Janeiro of complications from diabetes. He was 79 years old.

Titles 

 Flamengo

 Campeonato Carioca: 1953, 1954, 1955
 Torneio Início do Campeonato Carioca: 1952, 1959
 Torneio Rio-São Paulo: 1961
 Taça dos Campeões Estaduais Rio-São Paulo: 1956

See also 

 List of Clube de Regatas do Flamengo players

References

External links
Profile at Flaestatistica.com

1932 births
2012 deaths
Brazilian footballers
CR Flamengo footballers
Deaths from diabetes
Association football defenders
Footballers from Rio de Janeiro (city)